Tony King may refer to:

 Tony King (actor) (born 1947), American actor
 Tony King (businessman) (born 1964), Australian businessman
 Tony King (footballer) (born 1955), former Australian rules footballer
 Tony King (EastEnders), fictional character from the BBC soap opera EastEnders

See also
 Anthony King (disambiguation)
 Antony King (born 1974), British live audio engineer